Pentagon (stylized in all caps; abbreviated as PTG) is a South Korean multi-national boy band formed by Cube Entertainment in 2016. The group consists of nine members: Jinho, Hui, Hongseok, Shinwon, Yeo One, Yan An, Yuto, Kino and Wooseok. Originally composed of ten members, E'Dawn left the group and the record label on November 14, 2018. They were introduced through the Mnet survival show Pentagon Maker. Pentagon released their self-titled debut EP on October 10, 2016.

Name
The group name Pentagon refers to becoming a perfect group by completing the five elements that an idol must have: vocal/rap, dance, teamwork, talent, and mind.

History

Pre-debut
In 2010, Hui was a trainee at JYP Entertainment after winning first place on Best Male Vocal at JYP 7th Audition Final Round. He also competed in the first season of Chinese Idol but failed to make the cut. Kino was a member of a dance team called Urban Boyz. In December 2013, Hui, E'Dawn, Yeo One, and Kino participated in the special stage dance at the KBS Song Festival. In February 2014, E'Dawn and Kino danced at Jirayu Tangsrisuk's 1st concert "James Ji Monkey King Fan Meeting". Jinho debuted under the stage name Jino as a member of SM the Ballad. Hongseok participated in Mnet and YG Entertainment's reality survival show Mix and Match. However, he failed to become a member of the winning boy group, iKon. He and Jinho joined Cube in 2015. Yan An and Yuto passed "Cube Star World Audition" overseas selection and became Cube trainees in 2014. In February 2015, Jinho and Hui participated in a vocal project group Seorin-dong Children (서린동 아이들) and released a remake of Lee Won-jin and Ryu Keum-deok's 1994 classic "For All the New Lovers".

On December 31, 2015, Cube Entertainment revealed that they would debut their third boy group, after Beast and BtoB, named Pentagon.

2016: Pentagon Maker, debut with Pentagon and Five Senses and Japanese debut
On April 26, 2016, Cube Entertainment introduced Pentagon with the trailer, "Come into the World". The group's official Twitter, Facebook and Weibo opened on the same day.

The group participated in South Korean television channel Mnet's reality program, Pentagon Maker, which aired online through Mnet's digital content brand M2. The team was based on five categories: vocal or rap, dance, talent, mind, and teamwork. Each member was judged individually or as a unit, to determine whether they were suitable to become a member of Pentagon. They were set to debut on July 16, 2016. By the end of the show, Jinho, Hui, Hongseok, Yeo One, Yuto, Kino, and Wooseok were confirmed as the official members of the group.

On July 9, Pentagon released the collaboration songs "Young" (produced by Dok2) and "Find Me" (produced by Tiger JK). A music video for "Young", featuring members Hui, Yeo One, Kino, Wooseok, and Yuto, was released. The group was originally scheduled to host their debut concert on July 23, 2016, at Jamsil Indoor Stadium, but Cube Entertainment delayed the concert and debut date of the group due to internal issues.

Pentagon made their official debut on October 10, 2016, with 10 members, including the members eliminated from Pentagon Maker, E'Dawn, Shinwon, and Yan An. On the same day, Pentagon released their first Korean EP Pentagon comprising seven tracks including the lead single "Gorilla", and held their debut showcase. The EP peaked number seven on the Gaon chart and remained top 10 for two consecutive weeks in the Japan's Tower Record Kpop weekly chart. On October 24, Shinwon was not able to participate in the promotions due to knee injury. On November 4, Cube revealed that Pentagon will be making their official debut in Japan on December 10, 2016. On November 7, Pentagon held their first fan signing with an attendance of 100 people. Pentagon received the nickname 'King Kongdol' due to their gorilla dance in their debut song 'Gorilla'.

The group held their first solo concert, "Pentagon Mini Concert Tentastic Vol. 1", on December 6 at the Yes24 Live Hall in Gwangjin District, Seoul. The tickets for the concert were sold out within eight minutes of going on sale. They gave a sneak preview of their new song "Can You Feel It" ahead of their comeback.

On December 7, the group released their second EP Five Senses. Rappers Wooseok and Yuto contributed lyrics to the lead single of the EP titled "Can You Feel It". It was described as a medium-tempo hip-hop song that combines strong beat with a cheerful guitar riff and an intense brass sound.

On December 10, Pentagon held their first showcase in Japan at Toyosu Pit, Tokyo, Japan with more than 3,000 people attending. On December 11, Pentagon appeared in Abema TV 'Fresh!' Kpopstarz and recorded over 340,000 live viewers. The group recorded at least four times the average live viewers of Beast, VIXX, B.A.P, Boyfriend, and U-Kiss, and has the second highest number of viewers in the history of the program. Pentagon set three 'high speed' records, including the fastest group to debut in Japan, fastest domestic solo concert, and the fastest concert to sold out. Pentagon participated in Cube Entertainment's Christmas season song, with their label mates Hyuna, Jang Hyun-seung, BtoB, Roh Ji-hoon and CLC. "Special Christmas" was released digitally on December 12, 2016, as a Christmas gift for fans.

Pentagon ranked 9 on Billboard's 10 Best New K-Pop Groups In 2016.

2017: "Pretty Pretty", rise in popularity in Japan, Gorilla, Ceremony, Demo_01 and Demo_02

On January 22, 2017, Pentagon released a special music video for "Pretty Pretty", a track from their second Korean EP Five Senses, featuring I.O.I's Kim Chung-ha.

On March 29, Pentagon released their first Japanese EP Gorilla, which debuted at number six on the Gaon chart and third on the Oricon Chart. The album contains six tracks, including Japanese versions of previously released tracks "Gorilla", "Can You Feel It", "Pretty Pretty", and "You Are", along with two new Japanese tracks, "Hikari" and "Get Down". Pentagon sold out a reservation for their special mini live & talk concert at Shinagawa Stellaball in Tokyo to commemorate the release of Japan's first EP on March 24. More than 5,000 people applied to attend but due to the capacity limit, only a total of 4000 seats were available. According to Japan's Tower Records, Gorilla was ranked first in the album charts throughout the day and peaked at third place on Oricon's Daily Album Chart with debut sales of 10,292 copies. On March 3, Gorilla took first place in the Japanese Tower Records Monthly Chart and earned their fourth 'high speed' to achieve first place in the Japanese chart.

On May 18, the group released the single "Beautiful", a ballad produced by label-mate Jung Il-hoon. The group held their three-day concert titled "Tentastic Vol. 2 'Trust'" from June 10–12 at the Shinhan Card Fan Live Hall. The concert was divided into "P day", "T day", and "G day" and showcased different concepts and performances. Tickets to the concerts were sold out in ten minutes.

On June 12, the group released their third Korean EP Ceremony that includes the pre-released single "Beautiful" and the lead single "Critical Beauty" (예뻐죽겠네). The EP became their first U.S. chart entry, arriving on Billboard's world chart at number 14. Member Yan An was unable to participate in the album promotions and activities due to a right-hand injury sustained on May 31, 2017. On July 24, they released a surprise music video for their fans, "To Universe". On the same day, Pentagon received their first rookie award at Asia Model Awards.

In September, they released a short film "When I Was in Love" starring Gong Seung-yeon ahead of the comeback. On September 6, the group released their fourth Korean EP Demo_01 which includes the lead single "Like This", produced by Hui. The EP marked their first all self-composed songs since debut. They also held their third solo concert, "Pentagon Mini Concert Tentastic Vol. 3, 'Promise'" at the Yes24 Live Hall in Gwangjin District, Seoul. The group made a special appearance on television series, Hello, My Twenties! 2, that was aired on JTBC. Pentagon received their second rookie award at 1st Soribada Best K-Music Awards on September 20, and followed by Rising star Award at Korea Music Festival Special Awards.

On October 10, one year after debut, Pentagon hit 10,000 likes on MelOn for "Like This".

They released a pre-release song, "Stay" on November 14, which featured Pentagon's vocalists. On November 22, the group released their fifth Korean EP Demo_02 which includes the lead single "Runaway", the second single to have been produced by Hui. The group subsequently held their fourth solo concert, "Pentagon Mini Concert Tentastic Vol. 4, 'Dream'" at Blue Square I-Market Hall in Seoul. The following day, the group released a special music video, "Violet". The song is a sentimental song composed by Kino and co-written by E'Dawn, Yuto and Wooseok.

Pentagon's Gorilla EP took third place in the K-pop Japan Top 10 album.

2018: Violet, Positive, Shine, E'Dawn's departure, and Thumbs Up!

On January 17, 2018, Pentagon released their second Japanese EP Violet. The EP debuted at number one on Tower Record weekly album chart and ranked fourth in the Oricon Weekly Album Chart. They held their last solo concert, "Pentagon Mini Concert Tentastic Vol. 5, Miracle" on April 1 at Blue Square I-Market Hall, Seoul.

On April 2, Pentagon released their sixth Korean EP Positive which features six tracks including lead single "빛나리 (Shine)". The song eventually becoming a sleeper hit by word of mouth from listeners due to its unique melody and powerful choreography. Since its release, the lowest it placed on Melon's daily chart was in the 500s, but it slowly rose to number 186 on April 29. A month after its release, on May 1, the track rose to number 95 at Melon's real-time chart. The single peaked at number 16. "Shine" debuted at number 85 on Gaon Digital Chart and peaked at number 27. Subsequently, the company announced that the promotion period was extended by two weeks. They made their debut on Top 10 Billboard's World Digital Song Sales chart.

On August 18, Pentagon held their first fan meeting in Japan "僕たちの第一歩 (Our First Step)". Shine Japanese version, released on 29 August, was dedicated as TV Asahi's opening song for August episodes of late-night music program series 'Break Out'.

On September 10, Pentagon released their seventh Korean EP Thumbs Up!, which features five tracks including lead single "청개구리 (Naughty Boy)". E'Dawn and Yan An were absent from the comeback. After Hyuna announced her relationship with E'Dawn in August, on September 13, Cube Entertainment announced that they would be terminating their contracts, citing that they could not "maintain trust" with them. On November 14, Cube Entertainment officially confirmed E'Dawn's departure from the group and company.

Pentagon made their first appearance on an episode of Immortal Songs on October 6, 2018. The theme for the episode was "Korean Lyric Awards Special", which they performed a rendition of Kim Wan-sun's classic hit "The Pierrot Smiles At Us", a song recorded and released in 1990. The group received 383 points but lost to Jung Dong-ha by one point. On November 25, the group held a fan meeting "PENTAGon MOVINGon" at Nakano Sun Plaza, Tokyo with an attendance of 2,000 people. This is the first activity since E'Dawn's official departure.

In Japan, Shine ranked 4th and Violet ranked 10th on Oricon's 2018 Indie Albums. Violet also ranked 8th on Tower Records' list of 2018 K-Pop Domestic Albums.

2019: Cosmo, Genie:us, Sum(me:r) and first world tour

Pentagon held their first Japan Zepp tour - Dear Cosmo Tour across Osaka, Nagoya, Tokyo, and Fukuoka. Pentagon had their Japanese debut in February with the single, Cosmo. composed and written by Teru. The song ranked no.1 on the Oricon chart, other than iTunes.

On February 24, they held their second fan club fan meeting 'UNIONE' (Let's Play with Pentagon) at Olympic Hall. On March 27, they released their eighth Korean EP Genie:us with the lead single "신토불이 (Sha La La)". Kino was not able to participate in performances due to an injury but participated in all other promotional activities. However, he was able to participate in Pentagon's follow-up song "Spring Snow".

In April, Pentagon appeared again on Immortal Songs 2 as a contestant, performing Kim Yeon-ja's "Nation of Morning" in Japan as part of the show's 400th episode special. Pentagon held their first solo-concert "Prism" on 27 and 28 April 2019 at Blue Square iMarket Hall. The tickets were sold out in a day. On May 2, Cube entertainment announced Pentagon's first world tour concert, Prism World Tour, with 15 cities worldwide and 16 shows. On June 16, Pentagon represented South Korea in the annual Star of Asia in Almaty, Kazakhstan that gathers more than 20,000 people at the Medeu High-Rink. In July, Pentagon announced an additional eight cities for their Prism world tour, which covered twenty-three cities worldwide. On July 22, Cube Entertainment announced that Yan An would not be able to participate in Pentagon's 2019 world tour, "Prism", due to medical reasons.

They released their ninth extended play Sum(me:r) on July 17, without Yan An due to health reasons, with lead single "Humph!" being co-produced by Giriboy and Hui.

2020: Universe: The Black Hall, Road to Kingdom, Yan An's return, Universe: The History, We:th and "Eternal Flame"
On February 12, Pentagon released their first full album, Universe: The Black Hall with the lead single "Dr. Bebe". The group continued to promote as eight as Yan An did not participate in the promotions. Their first studio album features 11 tracks that were co-written or feature lyrics by members Jinho, Hui, Wooseok, Kino, and Yuto. The music video was brought forward to midnight KST on February 12 due to the overwhelming response. Pentagon continued their promotion activities with follow-up song "Shower of Rain" starting March 12, on MCountdown.

On March 5, Pentagon collaborated with Japanese rock music icon Glay in "I'm Loving You" as a part of Glay's 25th anniversary album Review II-Best of Glay. The song was described as a genre-bending song of an upbeat Latin-inspired dance-pop song with a killer electronic breakdown.

Pentagon participated in Mnet's reality television competition Road to Kingdom, which aired from April to June. For first performances - Song of King, the group performed Hui's arrangement of Block B's "Very Good" with reimagined Mad Max concept. They were ranked second in the first contest rankings. For the second round with the theme of 'My Song', Pentagon chose "Shine + Spring Snow" (빛나리+봄눈) as songs that best capture their team's story. 
It was the last time Pentagon would perform together before the eldest member Jinho enlisted for his mandatory military service as an active duty soldier on May 11, 2020. When the song transitioned from "Shine" to "Spring Snow", a video message made by members except Jinho played, containing their sincere feelings toward Jinho.  They were placed third in the first elimination round. Pentagon and ONF took first place in the collaboration stage of the first round on the 3rd round, performing a reinterpretation of Blackpink's "Kill This Love", and second round, Pentagon performed Monsta X's "Follow" with a Pharaoh theme. On June 12, the group released a new song "Basquiat" for the program's finale, and finished in third place overall.

In September, the song "Humph" which was released on July 17, 2019, become a hot topic on social media and internet communities. Korean Netizen opined "the song that is perfect for the COVID-19 pandemic situation. The lyrics "Do not cross the line Stop / No access to there are no access / Oh you have crossed the line right now / Oh, please keep it", the youthful melody and cute choreography of the song is good to use in a campaign to encourage social distancing." This song became popular in memes and MV views increased accordingly.

On September 6, they held an online fan meet and concert called Pentag-on Air, where they performed various songs, including a non-released acoustic English version of the song, "Spring Snow" . 70% of attendees were international fans and 30% were domestic fans. On September 16, Pentagon released the song "Twenty-Twenty", which was the first OST for the web drama Twenty-Twenty. The song was composed by Kino and contains lyrics written by Kino and Wooseok. On September 17, Pentagon posted a teaser titled "I've been keeping an eye on you" showcasing Yan An, officially ending his 440-day hiatus.

On September 23, the group released their first Japanese studio album (second album overall), Universe: The History. The album included Japanese songs from their debut EP, Gorilla, and debut singles "Cosmo" and "Happiness / Sha La La". The album debuted at number 7 on Oricon Albums Chart, and number 8 on Billboard Japan Hot Albums.

On October 12, Pentagon released their tenth extended play, We:th, as an eight-member group without member Jinho, who was completing his mandatory military service. The lead single, "Daisy", is an alternative rock song with a trendy yet intense sound, produced by Pentagon members Hui and Wooseok, and composer Nathan. The album consists of six songs, including "I'm Here", a self-composed solo song by Jinho. We:th became their highest selling album by selling 64,045 physical copies on the first week of release. On October 20, the group earned their first music show win after four years with "Daisy" on SBS MTV's The Show. On October 28, the group released the official Chinese and Japanese version of the song. On November 10, Pentagon began hosting their first podcast with DIVE Studios, titled Pentagon's Jack Pod. In December, Pentagon held a live online concert 2020 Pentagon Online Concert [WE L:VE] on December 13.

On December 18, Pentagon released the digital single "Eternal Flame".

2021: Love or Take and Do or Not 
On January 28, Pentagon released "Honey Drop" as the first OST for the web drama Replay: The Moment. Hui enlisted for his mandatory military service as a social service worker on February 18. In the meantime, all of the members will distribute his role among themselves without an assigned temporary leader. The group cameoed in the web drama Nickname Pine Leaf for the SBS YouTube channel yogurD in March. On March 15, Pentagon released their eleventh extended play Love or Take with the lead single "Do or Not".
 
On June 14, Pentagon released their fourth Japanese EP, Do or Not, which contains the Japanese version of the lead single of the same name.

On August 18, members Yuto, Kino and Wooseok collaborated to release the digital single "Cerberus".

Jinho was discharged from military service on November 14, without returning to the unit after his final vacation, according to the Ministry guidelines for preventing the spread of COVID-19. On November 24, Kino tested positive for COVID-19.

2022: In:vite U and Feelin' Like
On January 24, Pentagon released their twelfth extended play In:vite U with the lead single "Feelin' Like".

On February 21, it was announced that Yanan would be going to see his family for personal matters and stay with them for the time being. As of December 2022 he has yet to return and no further statement regarding his future in the group has been made. 

On March 4, it was confirmed that Pentagon's fan meeting, Pentagon's Private Party, will be held on April 2 and 3.

On May 3, Hongseok enlisted for his mandatory military service as an active duty soldier.

On August 9, Kino made his solo debut with the special digital single "Pose", making him the first member of Pentagon with an official solo debut.

On September 14, Pentagon released their fifth Japanese EP, Feelin' Like, which contains the Japanese version of the lead single of the same name.

Philanthropy
In September 2018, Pentagon donated 50 million won (approximately US$44,500) to Gangnam Severance Hospital's Respiration Rehabilitation Center for patients with rare neuromuscular disease. Pentagon's leader Hui said,

Ambassadorship
On September 27, 2017, Pentagon has been appointed as an honorary ambassador of the Korea Copyright Protection Service at the 1st anniversary of Korea Copyright Protection Office and Future Vision 2021. On June 24, 2020, Korea's Red Cross Youth appointed Pentagon as their new ambassador.

Endorsements
Before the official debut of Pentagon, the ten members were chosen as new models to endorse Econeko & Sausando's Organic Ice Cream Bubble Cleanser in 2016. On August 18, 2016, school uniform brand Elite announced their collaboration with Pentagon and I.O.I as their new models. In 2017–19, they became the endorsement model for D'Live+ OTT set-top box. On April 16, 2021, Pentagon started endorsing the Thai juice brand Tipco.

Members
Adapted from their Naver profile.

Current members 
Active
 Jinho – vocalist 
 Hongseok – vocalist
 Hui – leader, vocalist, dancer 
 Shinwon – vocalist
 Yeo One – vocalist
 Yan An – vocalist 
 Yuto – rapper, dancer, vocalist
 Kino – dancer, vocalist, rapper
 Wooseok – rapper, vocalist
Former members
 E'Dawn – rapper, dancer (2016–2018)

Timeline

Discography

Korean albums
 Universe: The Black Hall (2020)

Japanese albums
 Universe: The History (2020)

Filmography

Variety show
 Road to Kingdom (Mnet, 2020)

Reality shows
 Pentagon Maker (Mnet-M2, 2016)
 Pentory  (Naver V App, YouTube, 2016–present)
 Pentagon's Textbook (Naver V App, 2016–2018)
 Pentagon's Private Life  (MBC HeyoTV, 2016–2017)
 Pentagon's To Do List (Naver V App, 2017)
 Pentagon's TNL (Thursday Night Live) (Naver V App, 2017) (YouTube, 2019)
 Just Do It Yo! (YouTube, 2018–present)
 Pentagon X Star Road (Naver V App, 2019–2020)

Drama
 Spark (Naver TV Cast, 2016)
 Hello, My Twenties! 2 (JTBC, 2017)

Concert and tours

Headlining tours
 1st Japan Zepp tour - "Dear Cosmo Tour" (2019)
 Prism World Tour (2019)

Headlining concerts
 Pentagon Mini Concert Tentastic Vol.1 - Love (2016)
 PENTAGON 1st Concert in Japan (2017)
 Pentagon Mini Concert Tentastic Vol.2 - Trust (2017)
 Pentagon 2017 Tentastic Live Concert in Japan (2017)
 Pentagon Mini Concert Tentastic Vol.3 - Promise (2017)
 Pentagon 2017 Tentastic Live Concert in Tokyo (2017)
 Pentagon Mini Concert Tentastic Vol.4 - Dream (2017)
 PENTAGON! Great Live Concert in Japan 2018 Your Whiteday (2018)
 Pentagon Mini Concert Tentastic Vol.5 - Miracle (2018)
 Pentagon concert "PRISM" (2019)
 2020 Pentagon Online Concert [WE L:VE] (2020)

Awards and nominations

References

External links

Pentagon Official Facebook

 
2016 establishments in South Korea
K-pop music groups
Musical groups established in 2016
South Korean dance music groups
South Korean boy bands
Cube Entertainment artists
English-language singers from South Korea
Japanese-language singers of South Korea
Mandarin-language singers of South Korea